The 2010–11 Ligue 1 season (known as Ligue 1 Orange for sponsorship reasons) was the 73rd since its establishment. Entering the season, Marseille were the defending champions. The fixtures were announced on 21 May 2010 and the season began on 7 August and ended on 29 May 2011. The winter break was in effect between 23 December and 15 January 2011. There were three promoted teams from Ligue 2, replacing the three teams that were relegated from Ligue 1 following the 2009–10 season. A total of 20 teams currently competes in the league with three clubs suffering relegation to the second division, Ligue 2. All clubs that secured Ligue 1 status for the season were subject to approval by the DNCG before becoming eligible to participate. In addition, German sportswear company Puma, whom the Ligue de Football Professionnel share a partnership with, provided a brand new match ball for the new season.

Lille clinched the league title on 21 May 2011 with one match to spare after drawing 2–2 with Paris Saint-Germain away at the Parc des Princes.
The title was the club's third overall and its first in over 57 years. As a result of Lille also winning the Coupe de France during the season, the club became the third different club in three consecutive seasons to win some form of the double in France. In 2009, Bordeaux captured the league and league cup double and, in the following season, Marseille did the same.

Teams

On 19 April, Caen drew 0–0 with Nîmes. The draw assured Caen a return to Ligue 1 after falling down to Ligue 2 the previous season. On 30 April, Brest secured promotion to Ligue 1, for the first time since being administratively relegated in 1991, following stalemates in matches involving Metz and Clermont. Brest capped the promotion by defeating Tours 2–0 on the same day. On 14 May, on the final day of the Ligue 2 season, Arles-Avignon became the last Ligue 2 club to achieve promotion to the first division. The club defeated fourth-place club Clermont 1–0 at home to earn promotion. The club had achieved promotion to Ligue 2 from the third-tier Championnat National the previous season meaning the club has jumped two divisions in just two seasons.

Grenoble was the first club to suffer relegation to Ligue 2. The club's impending drop occurred on 10 April 2010 following the team's 4–0 defeat to Toulouse. On 3 May 2010, both Boulogne and Le Mans were relegated to Ligue 2 following defeats. Le Mans relegation was confirmed following their 3–2 loss away to Nancy, while Boulogne suffered relegation after losing 1–0 to Saint-Étienne, who both Boulogne and Le Mans were trailing. Boulogne's return to Ligue 2 meant a short-lived stay in the highest division. The club had successfully earned promotion to Ligue 1 the previous year.

Stadia and locations
On 17 May 2010, the Ligue de Football Professionnel announced that, for the first time in French football history, two clubs, Lorient and Nancy, would switch the surface of their football pitch from grass to artificial turf. This type of surface is common in North America and Eastern Europe, but is considered rare in Western Europe. Both clubs attributed the switch to weather and ecological problems with severe cold fronts affecting their regions every winter. The switch would, in turn, reduce energy costs and also avoid cancellations of matches due to a frozen pitch. Also, in Lorient's case, a constant proliferation of earthworms onto their pitch over the past two seasons had led to a rapid deterioration of the ground, which has forced the club to spend as much as €2 million to replace it. Both clubs previously toured Russia, Austria, and Norway to become better acclimated with the surface.

1Source: As of 26 April 2011

Personnel and kits

1 Subject to change during the season.

Managerial changes

League table

Results

Season statistics

Top scorers 

Last updated: 29 May 2011
Source: Official Goalscorers' Standings

Scoring 
First goal of the season: Mevlüt Erdinç for Paris Saint-Germain against Saint-Étienne (7 August 2010)
Quickest goal of the season: 58 seconds – Nenê for Paris Saint-Germain against Auxerre (24 October 2010)
Latest goal in a match in the season: 90+6 minutes – Anthony Modeste for Bordeaux against Nice (12 September 2010)
Widest winning margin: 5 goals
Lyon 5–0 Arles-Avignon (6 March 2011)
Lille 5–0 Arles-Avignon (1 May 2011)
Highest scoring game: 9 goals
Lille 6–3 Lorient (5 December 2010)
Most goals scored in a match by a single team: 6 goals – Lille 6–3 Lorient (5 December 2010)

Discipline 
Worst overall disciplinary record (1 pt per yellow card, 3 pts per second yellow card/red card):
Montpellier – 98 points (77 yellow & 7 red cards)
Best overall disciplinary record:
Brest – 48 points (48 yellow & 0 red cards)
Most yellow cards (club):
Caen – 80
Most yellow cards (player): 13
Renato Civelli (Nice)
Alaixys Romao (Lorient)
Dennis Oliech (Auxerre)
Most red cards (club): 8
Arles-Avignon
Lyon
Most red cards (player): 2
Aly Cissokho (Lyon)
Renato Civelli (Nice)
Drissa Diakité (Nice)
Sambou Yatabaré (Caen)

Awards

Monthly

UNFP Player of the Month

Yearly 

The nominees for the Player of the Year, Goalkeeper of the Year, Young Player of the Year, Manager of the Year, and Goal of the Year in Ligue 1. The winners were determined at the annual UNFP Awards, which were held on 22 May. The winners will be displayed in bold.

Player of the Year

Young Player of the Year

Goalkeeper of the Year

Manager of the Year

Team of the Year

Number of teams by region

List of 2010–11 transfers

References

External links

 Official site 

Ligue 1 seasons
France
1